Zbyněk Busta (born 10 March 1967) is a Czech football manager, currently the manager of Most. He managed Bohemians 1905 in the 2007–08 Gambrinus liga.

Busta led Bohemians 1905, resigning with six matches of the 2007–08 Gambrinus liga remaining.

In October 2011 Busta took over at Kladno. During the winter break of the 2011–12 season, Busta moved to Písek, saving them from relegation from the Bohemian Football League in his tenancy before leaving in June 2012.

After the first match of the spring part of the 2012–13 Czech 2. Liga, Busta replaced Michal Zach as manager of Most.

References

External links
Profile at soccerway.com

1967 births
Living people
Czech football managers
Czech First League managers
Bohemians 1905 managers
SK Kladno managers
FK Baník Most managers